Sir Robert Hilton (died c. 1431), of Swine and Winestead in Holderness, Yorkshire, was an English Member of Parliament for Lincolnshire in March 1416 and for Yorkshire 1419, 1425, 1426 and 1427.

References

14th-century births
1431 deaths
People from Holderness
15th-century English people
English MPs March 1416
English MPs 1419
English MPs 1425
English MPs 1426
English MPs 1427
Members of the Parliament of England for constituencies in Yorkshire